The Falkland Islands general election of 1956 was held in March and April 1956 to elect members to the Legislative Council. Four out of the twelve Councillors were elected through universal suffrage, two from Stanley and one each from East Falkland and West Falkland. Owing to the remoteness of some settlements and the unpredictability of the weather on the Falkland Islands, the election took place over several days.

Results
Candidates in bold were elected.  Candidates in italic were incumbents.

Stanley constituency

East Falkland constituency

West Falkland constituency

References

1956 elections in South America
1956
General election
Non-partisan elections
March 1956 events in South America
April 1956 events in South America
1956 elections in the British Empire